Mount Moriah is a mountain located in Coos County, New Hampshire. The mountain is part of the Carter-Moriah Range of the White Mountains, which runs along the northern east side of Pinkham Notch. Mount Moriah is flanked to the northeast by Middle Moriah Mountain and to the southwest by Imp Mountain. The summit is located on the Appalachian Trail and affords views in all directions.

See also

 List of mountains in New Hampshire
 White Mountain National Forest

References

External links
  HikeTheWhites.com: Mount Moriah

Mountains of New Hampshire
Mountains of Coös County, New Hampshire
Mountains on the Appalachian Trail
New England Four-thousand footers